

Events

January–March 
 January 1
 Battle of Koregaon: Troops of the British East India Company score a decisive victory over the Maratha Empire. 
 Mary Shelley's Frankenstein is published anonymously in London.
 January 2 – The British Institution of Civil Engineers is founded.
 January 3 (21:52 UTC) – Venus occults Jupiter. It is the last occultation of one planet by another before November 22, 2065.
 January 6 – The Treaty of Mandeswar brings an end to the Third Anglo-Maratha War, ending the dominance of Marathas, and enhancing the power of the British East India Company, which controls territory occupied by 180 million Indians.
 January 11 – Percy Bysshe Shelley's Ozymandias is published pseudonymously in London.
 January 12 – The Dandy horse (Laufmaschine bicycle) is invented by Karl Drais in Mannheim.
 February 3 – Jeremiah Chubb is granted a British patent for the Chubb detector lock.
 February 5 – Upon his death, King Charles XIII of Sweden (Charles II of Norway) is succeeded on both thrones by his adoptive son Charles XIV/III John, starting the Royal House of Bernadotte.
 February 11 – Marie André Cantillon attempts to assassinate the Duke of Wellington in Paris.
 February 12 – Chilean Declaration of Independence from Spain is proclaimed in Chile.
 March 15 – First Seminole War: General Andrew Jackson and his American army invade Florida.
 March 22 – Easter Sunday in Western Christianity falls on its earliest possible date. In Western Christianity, it will not occur on this date again until 2285.

April–June 

 April 1 – First Seminole War – Battle of Miccosukee, Florida: General Andrew Jackson defeats chief Kinhagee.
 April 4 – The United States Congress adopts the flag of the United States as having thirteen red and white stripes, and one star for each state (twenty), with additional stars to be added whenever a new state is added to the Union.
 April 5 – Chilean War of Independence – Battle of Maipú: Patriot rebels, led by José de San Martín, decisively defeat the Spanish Royalists.
 April 7 –  Brooks Brothers, the oldest men's clothier in the United States, opens its first store on the northeast corner of Catherine and Cherry Streets in New York City, where the later South Street Seaport stands.
 April 14–August 9 – The United States Survey of the Coast operations is suspended.
 April 18 – John Ross sets sail on his ship, the Isabella, in search of the Northwest Passage.
 May 11
 Charles XIV of Sweden–Norway is crowned king of Sweden.
 The Old Vic Theatre is founded (as the Royal Coburg Hall) in London.
 The Westmorland Gazette is first published at Kendal in the Lake District of England; in July, Thomas De Quincey will begin a 16-month term as editor.
 June – Battle of Kafir Qala: The Afghans defeat a Persian invasion.
 June 10 – The British Parliament is dissolved by Prime Minister Jenkinson, and new elections are scheduled for August 4 for the House of Commons.
 June 11 – Prince William, Duke of Clarence and St Andrews, third oldest son of King George III and the future King William IV of the United Kingdom, marries Adelaide of Saxe-Meiningen.
 June 18 – At least 34 people are killed in Switzerland, when the melting of a glacier releases the natural dam of Lac de Mauvoisin, sending the waters of the lake and the Dranse River into the valley of Bagnes.

July–September 
 July 1 – After a war that began on November 5, 1817, the forces of the East India Company defeat Baji Rao II in battle and acquire control over the Maratha Empire.
 July 3 – English poet Lord Byron, resident in Italy, begins work on his satirical epic Don Juan. Although he completes the first canto by September 19, he will die in 1824 before he can finish the poem, after completing 16 cantos and working on the 17th.
 July 11 – The Bank of the United States reverses its policy of expanding credit, and sends notices to its borrowers nationwide demanding immediate repayment of balances due; the defaults during the next six months will trigger the Panic of 1819.
 July 15 – U.S. President James Monroe convenes a cabinet meeting, to discuss whether General Andrew Jackson's unauthorized invasion and conquest of Spanish Florida should be disavowed by the White House. Secretary of State John Quincy Adams persuades the President that the action is justifiable, in stopping terror caused by the Seminole tribes.
 July 29 – French physicist Augustin-Jean Fresnel submits his prizewinning "Memoir on the Diffraction of Light" to the French Academy of Sciences, precisely accounting for the limited extent to which light spreads into shadows, and thereby demolishing the oldest objection to the wave theory of light.
 July 31 – The first newspaper in Cleveland, Ohio is issued by publisher Andrew Logan. Using the original name of the small settlement (population 172), Logan names the weekly paper The Cleaveland Gazette & Commercial Register. 
 August 1 – A separate Topographical Bureau of the United States Department of War is established.
 August 4 – 1818 United Kingdom general election for the House of Commons. The Tory Party, led by Prime Minister Robert Jenkinson, retains its control of the government but loses some seats.
 September – Sir Stamford Raffles sets out to visit Lord Hastings, Governor-General of India, to gain his approval to establish a trading station at the southern tip of the Malay Peninsula (modern-day Singapore).
 September 7 – Carl III of Sweden–Norway is crowned king of Norway, in Trondheim.
 September 23 – Border markers are formally installed for the European territory of Moresnet.

October–December 
 October 5 – Claudine Thévenet (known as Mary of St. Ignatius) founds the Roman Catholic order Religieuses de Jésus-Marie ("Religious of Jesus And Mary") in Lyon, France.
 October 20 – A treaty between the U.S. and the United Kingdom establishes the boundary between the U.S. and British North America as the 49th parallel, from the Lake of the Woods to the Rocky Mountains, also creating the Northwest Angle.
 November 11 – Anglo-Chinese College is founded by Robert Morrison in Malacca (later renamed Ying Wa College).
 November 16 – The Saint Louis Academy, which later becomes Saint Louis University, is founded by Reverend Louis William Valentine Dubourg in the United States.
 December 3 – Illinois is admitted as the 21st U.S. state.
 December 13 – Cyril VI of Constantinople quits his place as an Ecumenical Patriarch.
 December 24 – The Christmas carol "Silent Night" (Stille Nacht), with words by the priest Josef Mohr, set to music by organist Franz Xaver Gruber, is first performed at St. Nikolaus Parish Church, in Oberndorf bei Salzburg, Austria.

Date unknown 
 Catholic–Orthodox clash in Aleppo.
 The first edition of the Farmers' Almanac is published in the United States.
 The first Serbian dictionary is published by Vuk Karadžić.
 Besses o' th' Barn Brass Band is formed in Whitefield, near Manchester in the north of England, by this date.
The Barakzai brothers expel Mahmud Shah and the Sadozais out of Afghanistan, dividing the provinces up amongst themselves.

Births

January–June 

 

 January 1 – J. P. C. Emmons, American attorney and politician (d. 1877)
 January 30 – Artúr Görgey, Hungarian military general, politician (d. 1916)
 February 4 – Emperor Norton, San Francisco eccentric and visionary (d. 1880)
 February 13 – Angelica Singleton Van Buren, Acting First Lady of the United States (d. 1877)
 February 14 – Frederick Douglass (his day of birth was never established; he adopted this date), American abolitionist author, statesman (d. 1895)
 February 18 – Pedro Figueredo, Cuban poet, musician, and freedom writer (d. 1870)
 March 11 – Henri Étienne Sainte-Claire Deville, French chemist (d. 1881)
 March 15 – Mariano Álvarez, Filipino general (d. 1924)
 March 22 – John Ainsworth Horrocks, English-born explorer of South Australia (d. 1846)
 March 24 – William E. Le Roy, American admiral (d. 1888)
 March 28 – Wade Hampton III, Confederate soldier and South Carolinian politician (d. 1902) 
 April 4 – Thomas Mayne Reid, Irish-American novelist (d. 1883)
 April 6 – Aasmund Olavsson Vinje, Norwegian journalist and poet (d. 1870)
 April 8 –
 King Christian IX of Denmark (d. 1906)
 August Wilhelm von Hofmann, German chemist (d. 1892)
 April 17 – Emperor Alexander II of Russia (d. 1881)
 April 19 – Sir Arthur Elton, 7th Baronet, English writer, Liberal Party politician (d. 1883)
 May 5 – Karl Marx, German political philosopher, co-author of The Communist Manifesto (d. 1883)
 May 27 – Amelia Bloomer, American dress reformer, women's rights activist (d. 1894)
 June 3 – Louis Faidherbe, French general and colonial administrator (d. 1889)
 June 17
 Sophie of Württemberg, Dutch queen (d. 1877)
 Charles Gounod, French composer (d. 1893)
 June 18 – Angelo Secchi, Italian astronomer (d. 1878)

July–December 

 July 1 – Ignaz Semmelweis, Hungarian physician, obstetrician (d. 1865)
 July 18
 Celadon Leeds Daboll, American merchant, inventor (d. 1866)
 Louis Gerhard De Geer, 1st Prime Minister of Sweden (d. 1896)
 July 22 – J. Gregory Smith, Vermont governor (d. 1891)
 July 27 – Agostino Roscelli, Italian priest, founder of the Institute of Sisters of the Immaculata (d. 1902)
 July 30
 Emily Brontë, British novelist (d. 1848)
 Jan Heemskerk, 2-time prime minister of the Netherlands (d. 1897)
 August 11 – Méry von Bruiningk, Estonian democrat (d. 1853) 
 August 25 – Shiv Dayal Singh, Founder and first SatGuru of RadhaSoami Faith (d. 1878) 
 September 1 – José María Castro Madriz, first President of Costa Rica, founder of the republic (d. 1892)
 September 12 – Richard Jordan Gatling, American inventor, gunsmith (d. 1903) 
 September 27 – Adolph Wilhelm Hermann Kolbe, German chemist (d. 1884)
 October 8 – John Henninger Reagan, American Confederate politician (d. 1905)
 October 12 – Maximilian Cercha, Polish painter and drawer (d. 1907)
 October 15 – Irvin McDowell, American general (d. 1885)
 October 18
 Francis Dutton, Germany-born Premier of South Australia (d. 1877)
 Edward Ord, U.S. Army officer (d. 1883)
 November 5 – Benjamin Franklin Butler, American lawyer, politician, and general (d. 1893)
 November 9 (October 28 (O.S.)) – Ivan Turgenev, Russian writer (d. 1883)
 November 23 – József Szlávy, 6th Prime Minister of Hungary (d. 1900)
 November 29 – George Brown, Canadian politician (d. 1880)
 December 13 – Mary Todd Lincoln, First Lady of the United States (d. 1882)
 December 18 – Max Joseph von Pettenkofer, German chemist and hygienist (d. 1901)
 December 24 – James Prescott Joule, English physicist (d. 1889)
 December 27 – J. Lawrence Smith, American chemist (d. 1883)

Date unknown
 Dimitrie Brătianu, 15th Prime Minister of Romania (d. 1892)

Deaths

January–June 

 January 2 – Martha Christina Tiahahu, Moluccan freedom fighter, national heroine of Indonesia (b. 1800)
 January 11 – Johann David Wyss, Swiss author (b. 1743)
 February 5 – Charles XIII/Charles II, King of Sweden and Norway (b. 1748)
 February 13 – George Rogers Clark, American Revolutionary leader (b. 1752)
 February 15 – Friedrich Ludwig, Fürst zu Hohenlohe-Ingelfingen, Prussian general (b. 1746)
 February 21 – David Humphreys, American diplomat (b. 1752)
 March 24 – Humphry Repton, English garden designer (b. 1752)
 April 16 – Nikolaus von Krufft, Austrian composer and civil servant (b. 1779)
 May 2 – Herman Willem Daendels, Governor-General of the Dutch East Indies (b. 1762)
 May 10 – Paul Revere, American patriot, silversmith (b. 1735)
 May 13 – Louis Joseph, Prince of Condé (b. 1736)
 May 26 – Michael Andreas Barclay de Tolly, Russian military commander (b. 1761)
 June 12 – Egwale Seyon, Emperor of Ethiopia
 June 24 – Alexander Kurakin, Russian diplomat (b. 1752)

July–December 

 July 28 – Gaspard Monge, French mathematician and geometer (d. 1746)
 August 4 – Tom Molineaux, African-American boxer (b. 1784)
 August 5 – Sir John Barrington, 9th Baronet of Great Britain (b. 1752)
 August 11 – Robert Carr Brackenbury, English Methodist preacher (b. 1752)
 August 12 – Nikolay Novikov, Russian writer (b. 1744)
 August 22 – Warren Hastings, English Governor-General of India (b. 1732)
 August 24 
 James Carr (Massachusetts politician), U.S. Congressman (b. 1777)
 George Thicknesse, 19th Baron Audley (b. 1758)
 August 31 – Arthur St. Clair, American soldier, politician (b. 1737)
 September 1 – Robert Calder, British naval officer (b. 1745)
 September 9 – Seymour Fleming, British noblewoman (b. 1758)
 October 5 – Nancy Hanks, mother of Abraham Lincoln (b. 1784)
 October 28 – Abigail Adams, First Lady of the United States (b. 1744)
 October 28 – Henri Jacques Guillaume Clarke, duc de Feltre, French marshal, politician (b. 1765)
 November 17 – Charlotte of Mecklenburg-Strelitz, queen of George III of the United Kingdom (b. 1744)
 December 25 – Catherine-Dominique de Pérignon, Marshal of France (b. 1754)

Date unknown 
 Ghaliyya Al Bogammiah, Saudi Arabian war heroine

References